"Paperfaces" is the fourth and final single from UK rock band Feeder's 1999 album Yesterday Went Too Soon. The version released on the single is a re-recording from that of the album version.

Upon release, the single was given little promotion by UK radio judging by the C-list placing on BBC Radio 1, as the previous two singles were played a lot more before release, and due to this the single only charted in the UK at #41. Frontman Grant Nicholas said the band were invited to perform the track on TFI Friday, but decided to U-turn on the band and instead gave the slot to the Stereophonics, meaning they appeared twice on the show and Feeder missed out on widespread promotion for this single.

However, the single did go top 40 in Scotland reaching No.37 and ever since the release of The Singles with an extra DVD of the band's videos, the song has seen a new lease of life. "Paperfaces" is about the idea of somebody ending a relationship, and then realising afters that the person they were with was somebody who meant a lot to them.

Track listing

CD1

 "Paperfaces" (single version edit) - 4:09
 "Whooey" - 3:57
 "Tinsel Town" (Radio 1 session in Wales) - 3:55

CD2
 "Paperfaces" (single version) - 4:39
 "Crash Mat" - 3:23
 "You're My Evergreen" (Radio 1 session in Wales) - 3:24

MC
 "Paperfaces" (single version) - 4:39
 "Whooey" - 3:59
 "Waiting For Changes" (Radio 1 session in Wales)

Rock ballads
1999 singles
Feeder songs
The Echo Label singles
1998 songs
Songs written by Grant Nicholas